Theodore E. Cummings (December 25, 1907 – March 30, 1982) was an Austrian-born American diplomat. A non-career appointee, he served as the American ambassador extraordinary and plenipotentiary to Austria until his death on March 30, 1982.

A longtime friend of Ronald Reagan, Cummings was considered a member of his Kitchen Cabinet.
He had known Reagan for a long time before he became president. Cummings had served in Reagan's governor administration as commissioner, California Commission on Judicial Qualification, California Hospital Commissioner and was a member of the Commission on Health Services Industry of the Cost of Living Council.

Biography
Cummings was a native of Austria. He was a resident of Beverly Hills, California, at the time of his death from cancer at Cedars-Sinai Medical Center. He was Chairman of Cedars-Sinai from 1954 until his appointment as Ambassador.  Prior to that, he opened the first Food Giant supermarket, in 1944, in Long Beach and then went on to develop a string of stores called . He went on to build a string of stores Builders Emporiums. He sold his holdings in 1968 for $52.5 million to Vornado Inc., of Garfield, New Jersey. Cummings died in Los Angeles, California on March 30, 1982, at the age of 74.

References

1907 births
1982 deaths
Ambassadors of the United States to Austria
People from Beverly Hills, California
Deaths from cancer in California
American company founders
Reagan administration personnel
Austrian emigrants to the United States
American business executives